Davuilevu, the name of the site of three Methodist Church of Fiji institutions: Davuilevu Theological College, the Bible School for Catechist training, and Lelean Memorial School. It can be translated as "the large conch shell."

Information
The use of the adjective "large" in this context is used by the church to convey the significance of the duty bestowed upon church members who attend the Davuilevu institutions, which surpasses even its physical size. It is the premier institution of the Methodist Church in Fiji and Rotuma. Indigenous Fijians use the giant conch shell (Charonia tritonis) as a horn to herald important events such as the birth and death of a high ranking chief.

Davuilevu is located at Nausori, Fiji.

It was the home station of Reverend Thomas Baker who was martyred and killed in 1867 by cannibals at Nubutautau in the upper reaches of the Navosa Hills. His famous words still ring true to those who enter Davuilevu. When warned of a possible plot against his missionary party, he replied in Fijian that "Sa yawa vei au ko Davuilevu, ka sa voleka vei au ko lomalagi," meaning, "Davuilevu is yet far, heaven for me is closer."

The Methodist Church moved its Theological College for Ministers and Bible School for Catechists from Navuloa to Davuilevu in 1907. Fiji's first technical and engineering school was also established here. Later the colonial government asked the assistance of the Methodist Church to help set up the government technical school. This was named the Derrick Technical Institute, after the founder and Principal of the Davuilevu Technical School, R.A. Derrick, and who was asked to set up the government technical school at Samabula, Suva. The Derrick Technical Institute was later renamed the Fiji Institute of Technology.

References

 Tippett, A.R., 1954, The Christian (Fiji 1835–1867), Auckland Institute and Museum, Auckland
 Thornley, Andrew; Exodus of the i Taukei, The Wesleyan Church in Fiji 1848-74; Institute of Pacific Studies, University of the South Pacific; 2002

Methodist Church of Fiji and Rotuma educational institutions